Three Forever is an Australian television series that first screened on SBS in 1998, with eight episodes produced.

Three Forever tells the story of three orphans, Danny, Frances and Paulie, who together are on a quest for happiness. Danny is searching for the mother who abandoned him at birth and feels like he is being continually rejected. Frances lost her parents in a tragic accident and now suddenly finds herself with strange powers. Paulie wants to be part of a loving family.

Cast
 Justin Hardi as Danny
 Miranda Elliott as Frances
 Thomas Gilmore as Paulie
 Peta Toppano as Maria
 Steve Monaco as Rick's mate

See also 
 List of Australian television series
 The Girl from Steel City

References

External links 
 Australian Television Information Archive

Australian drama television series
Special Broadcasting Service original programming
1998 Australian television series debuts
1998 Australian television series endings